Robert Thomas Jenkins CBE (31 August 1881 – 11 November 1969) was a Welsh historian and academic.

Life
Jenkins was born on 31 August 1881 in Liverpool.  He moved with his family to Bangor, Gwynedd, when his father was appointed clerk to the registrar of the newly established University College of North Wales.  However, both of his parents had died by 1888 and he was then brought up by his maternal grandparents in Bala, Gwynedd.  He was baptised by Thomas Charles Edwards and studied at Bala Grammar School before winning a scholarship to the University College of Wales, Aberystwyth, obtaining a first-class degree in English in 1901.  He then studied history and English at Trinity College, Cambridge before teaching in Llandysul (1904), in Brecon (1904 to 1917) and at the City of Cardiff High School for Boys (1917 to 1930). Whilst he was a teacher, his interest in history deepened and he began to start writing articles on historical topics.

In 1928, he published a history of Wales in the 18th century, with further books following in 1930, the year that he was appointed a lecturer at the University of Wales Bangor. He was appointed to a professorship at Bangor in 1945 and retired from the university in 1948, although he continued to work.

He co-wrote a history of the Honourable Society of Cymmrodorion in 1951, the year of its 200th anniversary.  He was awarded the CBE in 1956.  He died on 11 November 1969.

References

1881 births
1969 deaths
20th-century Welsh historians
Welsh schoolteachers
Alumni of Aberystwyth University
Alumni of Trinity College, Cambridge
Academics of Bangor University
Commanders of the Order of the British Empire